Nose-blowing is the act of expelling nasal mucus by exhaling forcefully through the nose. This is usually done into a facial tissue or handkerchief, facial tissues being more hygienic as they are disposed of after each use while handkerchiefs are softer and more environmentally-friendly.   

Nose-blowing may be used to alleviate nasal congestion or rhinorrhea (runny nose) resulting from colds, seasonal allergies, or to expel nasal irritants.

Technique 
The tissue or handkerchief is held gently against the nose. Prior to nose blowing, a deep inhale through the mouth or nose provides the air required to eject the nasal mucus. Exhaling hard through both nostrils at once (or, if only one nostril is congested, just the affected nostril) will effectively eject the mucus. The process may need to be repeated several times to sufficiently clear the entire nose.

Health effects 
While nose-blowing helps to alleviate symptoms of the common cold and hayfever, when it is done excessively or incorrectly it may bring potential adverse health effects. Nose-blowing generates high pressure in the nostrils. When this pressure is added to a dry nose, it could rupture blood vessels inside the nose, resulting in a nosebleed.

In a 2000 study, doctors squirted dense liquid dye, which could be seen on x-rays, into the noses of several adult volunteers. The volunteers were induced to sneeze, cough, and blow their noses. It was found that the typical pressure of nose-blowing was 1.3 pounds per square inch, ten times greater than that generated by sneezing or coughing. CT scans showed that nose blowing sent much of the dye into the paranasal sinuses rather than expelling it out of the nose. The doctors suspected that nose-blowing may increase the risk of sinus infections by sending bacteria-filled mucus into the sinuses.

In extremely rare but documented cases, nose-blowing has resulted in unusual conditions, such as in the case of a woman who fractured her left eye socket after blowing her nose.

Etiquette 

Nose-blowing becomes a breach of etiquette if it is performed directly in front of someone at a dining table or in a lobby in most cultures. It is also considered rude to continuously snort mucus back into the nose instead of blowing it. When nose-blowing needs to be carried out at the table, the person doing it should turn away from everybody else and especially away from the food on the table. If the nose-blowing session is going to be short, then it may be done at the table, but if the nose is too stuffed and the resulting nose-blowing session will be long and loud, then the person  is generally expected to go to the restroom/washroom.

See also
 Nose-picking
Sneezing
 Coughing

References

Rhinology
Sneeze